As-Easy-As for DOS and As-Easy-As for Windows was a shareware 32-bit spreadsheet program developed in 1986 for MS-DOS and later for Microsoft Windows. The name is a play on the phrase "as easy as 1-2-3", a reference to the dominant MS-DOS spreadsheet at that time, Lotus 1-2-3 with which it competed for a fraction of the contender's price. The program was developed and sold by TRIUS, Inc. (a company founded by David Schulz and Paris Karahalios a Shareware pioneer - not to be confused with Tritus, the makers of the Tritus SPF clone of the mainframe ISPF interface and editor). The company eventually branched out developing CAD and GIS/Mapping software and SDKs, not focusing on As-Easy-As.

History 

As-Easy-As is historically significant as one of the earliest and most useful shareware programs that competed with commercial software on the basis of both price and features. For small businesses and personal users, the price of Lotus 1-2-3 was prohibitive, and As-Easy-As provided basic spreadsheet functionality for about a tenth of the price. This paradigm of undercutting the spreadsheet market leader would be adopted by Borland's Quattro Pro (which was not released until 1990). Subsequent versions of As Easy As became as powerful as any MS-DOS spreadsheet. Like Quattro Pro, As-Easy-As combined some elements of the 1-2-3 user interface, while modernizing them. One such modernization is the use of pull-down menus.

Cell formulas are very similar to Lotus 1-2-3, including the letter-number addressing scheme (A1, B2, etc.) and the @function syntax (e.g.,@SUM(A1..A10) using the ".." range separator syntax also like Lotus 1-2-3.)

The product included a detailed electronic manual describing the spreadsheet's functions and some basic MS-DOS operations. 

Updated versions of As-Easy-As were made available at frequent intervals. Because these new versions often included valuable new capabilities, users were encouraged to support the continuing development of the program. Supporters who paid for a license received a 200+ page printed, detailed user's manual. The graphic defaults were more attuned to science and engineering users than to business users. This enabled a user to rapidly create x-y graphs of data, whereas the major commercial spreadsheets of the DOS era (Lotus 1-2-3 and Quattro) by default produced more business-oriented graphs. Many calculation functions were appealing to the science and engineering markets, such as improved capabilities for regression analysis and matrix operations.

The program was translated by TRIUS, Inc. into Spanish, German, French, Portuguese, Italian and Chinese and at the height of its popularity it was being published locally in 10+ countries in the Americas, Europe, Asia and Australia.

End of development 
On 3 November 2004, Trius discontinued the last version of As-Easy-As for DOS, and on 10 January 2006 the last version of As-Easy-As for Windows. Though copies of both programs were made available for downloading with free full licenses.

The earliest preserved historical version available on the Internet from the MS-DOS shareware era is version 3 from 1987.

Awards 
Some of the awards As-Easy-As received include:
 1992 - Shareware Industry Awards, Best Application, Winner
 1992 - PCM Reader's Best Award, Best Shareware Program
 1998 - AS-EASY-AS for Win95/NT, Shareware Industry Award, Best Application

Notes and references

External links 
 Version 3.0 from 1987 is at the abandonware website Vetusware, along with a later version. (Assuming that, if the Windows version is free, then the historical versions would also be free.)

DOS software
Spreadsheet software for Windows
Spreadsheet software
Shareware
Freeware